The gens Catiena was a Roman family during the late Republic.  It is known chiefly from a single individual, Titus Catienus.  Cicero describes him as an eques of low and mean character, who was angry with his brother, Quintus Tullius Cicero.

See also
 List of Roman gentes

Footnotes

Roman gentes